Patrick West (born 1974, London) is a British freelance writer and political commentator.

Early life 
He is the son of British journalist Richard West and Irish journalist Mary Kenny, the brother of the journalist Ed West, and cousin of actors Timothy West and Samuel West.

Career 
West has written for The Spectator, The Times Literary Supplement, and Standpoint. He is currently a regular columnist for Spiked.

According to Ben Schott, West's 2004 report, Conspicuous Compassion: Why Sometimes it Really is Cruel to be Kind criticised “grief tourism.” He wrote that: "We live in a post-emotional age, one characterised by crocodile tears and manufactured emotion. Ostentatious caring allows a lonely nation to forge new social bonds. Additionally, it serves as a form of catharsis. We saw this at its most ghoulish after the demise of Diana. In truth, mourners were not crying for her, but for themselves..."

West's 2005 report for Civitas, The Poverty of Multiculturalism, asserted that multiculturalism was losing its hold on public life.

Works 

Conspicuous Compassion, Civitas, 2004
The Poverty of Multiculturalism, Civitas, 2005 
Beating Them At Their Own Game, How The Irish Conquered English Soccer, Liberties Press, 2006
 The Times Questions Answered (editor), HarperCollins, 2004

References

Further reading 

 https://www.telegraph.co.uk/news/uknews/1455117/Britain-wallowing-in-mourning-sickness.html
 https://www.thetimes.co.uk/article/selfish-britain-blamed-for-new-grief-lite-qptnt9gxncb
 http://news.bbc.co.uk/2/hi/uk_news/3512447.stm
 http://news.bbc.co.uk/2/hi/uk_news/4295318.stm
 https://www.dailytelegraph.com.au/news/opinion/poms-passports-tell-truth/news-story/19ee6e1f432f40858f0939035e74807c?nk=98c2f234bd42b7b6ed3b14470a975ce1-1549171686
 https://www.theage.com.au/opinion/just-what-is-so-wrong-with-all-this-compassion-20050104-gdzatq.html

External links 
 Articles by Patrick West for New Statesman.

British non-fiction writers
English people of Irish descent
Alumni of the University of Manchester
1974 births
Living people
British male writers
Male non-fiction writers